This was the second season of the League Cup, which was known as the Players No.6 Trophy for sponsorship reasons.

Leeds won the trophy by beating Salford 12-7 in the final. The match was played at Fartown, Huddersfield. The attendance was 10,102 and receipts were £4563.

Background 
This season saw no changes in the  entrants, no new members and no withdrawals, the number remaining at thirty-two.

Competition and results

Round 1 - First  Round 
Involved  16 matches and 32 Clubs

Round 2 - Second  Round 
Involved  8 matches and 16 Clubs

Round 3 -Quarter Finals 
Involved 4 matches with 8 clubs

Round 3 -Quarter Finals - Replays 
Involved 2 matches with 4 clubs

Round 4 – Semi-Finals 
Involved 2 matches and 4 Clubs

Final

Teams and scorers 

Scoring - Try = three points - Goal = two points - Drop goal = one point

Prize money 
As part of the sponsorship deal and funds, the  prize money awarded to the competing teams for this season is as follows :-

Note - the  author is unable to trace the award amounts for this season. Can anyone help ?

The road to success

Notes and comments 
1 * Pilkington Recs are a Junior (amateur) club from St Helens, home ground was City Road until they moved to Ruskin Drive from 2011-12 
2 * Rothmans Rugby League Yearbook 1990-1991, Rothmans Rugby League Yearbook 1991-1992, and RUGBYLEAGUEproject give the score as 26-5  but News of the World Football Annual 1973-74 gives the score as 28-5
3 * highest score to date
4 * Dewsbury Celtic are a Junior (amateur) club from Dewsbury, home ground is Crow Nest Park
5 * RUGBYLEAGUEproject gives score as 10-28 but the Wigan official archives and 100 Years of Rugby. The History of Wakefield Trinity 1873-1973 and Wakefield until I die all give the score as 10-34
6 * News of the World Football Annual 1973-74 gives score as 24-3 but both RUGBYLEAGUEproject and Wigan official archives give it as 24-8
7 * Abandoned after 22 Minutes due to Fog with the score at 4-2 - Result declared void
8 * NO mention on Hull official website of any replay
9 * News of the World Football Annual 1973-74 gives the  score as 30-2 but both RUGBYLEAGUEproject and Wigan official archives give it as 39-2
10  * Fartown was the home ground of Huddersfield from 1878 to the end of the 1991-92 season to Huddersfield Town FC's Leeds Road stadium, and then to the McAlpine Stadium in 1994. Fartown remained as a sports/Rugby League ground but is now rather dilapidated, and is only used for staging amateur rugby league games.
Due to lack of maintenance, terrace closures and finally major storm damage closing one of the stands in 1986, the final ground capacity had been reduced to just a few thousands although the record attendance was set in a Challenge cup semi-final on 19 April 1947 when a crowd of 35,136 saw Leeds beat Wakefield Trinity 21-0

General information for those unfamiliar 
The council of the Rugby Football League voted to introduce a new competition, to be similar to The Football Association and Scottish Football Association's "League Cup". It was to be a similar knock-out structure to, and to be secondary to, the Challenge Cup. As this was being formulated, sports sponsorship was becoming more prevalent and as a result John Player and Sons, a division of Imperial Tobacco Company, became sponsors, and the competition never became widely known as the "League Cup" 
The competition ran from 1971-72 until 1995-96 and was initially intended for the professional clubs plus the two amateur BARLA National Cup finalists. In later seasons the entries were expanded to take in other amateur and French teams. The competition was dropped due to "fixture congestion" when Rugby League became a summer sport
The Rugby League season always (until the onset of "Summer Rugby" in 1996) ran from around August-time through to around May-time and this competition always took place early in the season, in the Autumn, with the final usually taking place in late January 
The competition was variably known, by its sponsorship name, as the Player's No.6 Trophy (1971–1977), the John Player Trophy (1977–1983), the John Player Special Trophy (1983–1989), and the Regal Trophy in 1989.

See also 
1972–73 Northern Rugby Football League season
1972 Lancashire Cup
1972 Yorkshire Cup
Player's No.6 Trophy
Rugby league county cups

References

External links
Saints Heritage Society
1896–97 Northern Rugby Football Union season at wigan.rlfans.com
Hull&Proud Fixtures & Results 1896/1897
Widnes Vikings - One team, one passion Season In Review - 1896-97
The Northern Union at warringtonwolves.org
Huddersfield R L Heritage
Wakefield until I die

1972 in English rugby league
1973 in English rugby league
League Cup (rugby league)